Qin may refer to:

Dynasties and states
 Qin (state) (秦), a major state during the Zhou Dynasty of ancient China
 Qin dynasty (秦), founded by the Qin state in 221 BC and ended in 206 BC
 Daqin (大秦), ancient Chinese name for the Roman Empire
 Former Qin (前秦), Di state/Di (Wu Hu) in the Sixteen Kingdoms period, 351 AD 
 Later Qin (后秦), Qiang state in the Sixteen Kingdoms period, 384 AD
 Western Qin (西秦), Xianbei state in the Sixteen Kingdoms period, 409 AD

Geography
 Qin (秦), another name of Shaanxi province, China
 Qin County (沁县), in Shanxi province, China
 Qin River (沁河) in Shanxi, tributary of the Yellow River
 Qin River (Hebei) (寢水) in Hebei, a former name of the Ming River

Other uses
 Qin (surname)
 Qin (board game)
 Qin (Mandaeism), a demon of the Mandaean underworld
 Qin (Star Wars), a character on the television series The Mandalorian
 BYD Qin, a car
 Guqin (古琴), or qin, Chinese stringed musical instrument
 QIN, an acronym for the Quinault Indian Nation, Native American peoples in the United States
 qin(), one representation of the functional fourth root of sin()

See also
 Qin Empire (disambiguation)